Ajirloo (also Romanized as Ajīrloo; also known as Ebrāhīmābād-e Qadīm (Persian: ابراهيم ابادقديم) and Ebrāhīmābād-e Ajīrloo) is a village in Savalan Rural District of the Central District of Parsabad County, Ardabil province, Iran. At the 2006 census, its population was 5,461 in 2091,107households. The following census in 2011 counted 5,493 people in 1,363 households. The latest census in 2016 showed a population of 4,259 people in 1,206 households; it was the largest village in its rural district.

References 

Parsabad County

Towns and villages in Parsabad County

Populated places in Ardabil Province

Populated places in Parsabad County